Bortolo Mutti (born 11 August 1954 in Trescore Balneario, Bergamo) is an Italian football manager and a former player, who was most recently manager of Livorno.

His older brother Tiziano Mutti also played football professionally. To distinguish them, Tiziano was referred to as Mutti I and Bortolo as Mutti II.

Career
After a reasonably good playing career as a striker/attacking midfielder with a number of Serie B and Serie C teams, including Atalanta, Mutti became a coach in 1988, when he made his debut at the helm of Interregionale club Palazzolo. From 1991 to 1993 he coached Leffe, achieving an impressive promotion to Serie C1. From 1993 to 1995 he served as coach of Serie B team Verona, obtaining two tenth places with the gialloblu. Later called to coach Serie B team Cosenza during the 1995–96 season, he led the club to save from relegation.

In 1996, he had his first opportunity to coach a Serie A team, Piacenza, where he achieved to keep the team in the Italian top flight. In 1997, he was called by Napoli, being however sacked soon later due to poor results in the Serie A. A sixth place in Serie B with Atalanta in 1998–99 was followed by a return to Cosenza, where he served as head coach for two seasons achieving an 11th and an 8th place. In 2001–02 he was appointed at the helm of newly promoted Serie B team Palermo, where he ended the season with an 11th place. He was called back by a Serie A team, Reggina, but was fired in the mid-season.

From 2003 to 2006 he moved to the other side of the local strait, at Messina, where Mutti achieved a promotion to Serie B in his first season; this was followed by a very impressive seventh place in their first Serie A campaign. However, Mutti's third season with Messina was not as successful as the previous two, being fired during the final part of the season. From February 2007 he is coach of Serie B club Modena, being sacked later on in the 2007–08 end of season due to a string of poor results.

On 11 January 2010 he agreed to return at his previous club Atalanta, taking over at the relegation-battling Serie A outfit from resigning boss Antonio Conte. He ultimately failed in his desperate attempt to save Atalanta, ending the season in a disappointing eighteenth place, which led his club not to confirm him for the new season.

On 10 February 2011 Mutti became the new head coach of bottom-placed Serie A club Bari in place of Giampiero Ventura. But, Bari were subsequently relegated to Serie B and he was dismissed after the 2010–11 season.

On 19 December 2011 he agreed to return to Palermo, replacing Devis Mangia as head coach of the Serie A club from Sicily. In his first game in charge of the club, he achieved a 2–2 draw against bottom-table strugglers Novara, which was followed by a 1–3 home defeat at the hands of Napoli. After a disappointing start, results improved in January also thanks to winter signings such as Emiliano Viviano, Franco Vázquez and Massimo Donati (the latter being team captain during his previous period at Bari), leading to a string of four consecutive home wins and a 4–4 away draw at San Siro against Inter that brought Palermo back into the fight for a UEFA Europa League spot. Palermo finished in 16th in the 2011–12 season and he was released six months after taking over as head coach.

References

External links
Coaching career profile 

1954 births
Living people
Sportspeople from the Province of Bergamo
Italian footballers
Italian football managers
U.S. Massese 1919 players
Delfino Pescara 1936 players
Catania S.S.D. players
Brescia Calcio players
Taranto F.C. 1927 players
Atalanta B.C. players
Mantova 1911 players
Serie B players
Serie C players
Hellas Verona F.C. managers
Cosenza Calcio managers
Piacenza Calcio 1919 managers
S.S.C. Napoli managers
Atalanta B.C. managers
Palermo F.C. managers
Reggina 1914 managers
A.C.R. Messina managers
Modena F.C. managers
U.S. Salernitana 1919 managers
S.S.C. Bari managers
Calcio Padova managers
Association football forwards
U.S. Livorno 1915 managers
People from Trescore Balneario
Footballers from Lombardy